Uttarakhand Technical University is a public university in the Indian state of Uttarakhand set up by the Government of Uttarakhand on 27 January 2005, through the Uttarakhand Technical University Act 2005. It has 8 constituent institutes and approximately 80 affiliated colleges spread all over the state.

Departments and faculties

 Architecture
 Business Management
 Mechanical Engineering
 Civil Engineering
 Chemical Engineering
 Electrical Engineering
 Electronics & Communication Engineering
 Computer Science and Engineering
 Industrial & Production Engineering
 Biotech Engineering
 Engineering and Technology
 Hotel Management and Catering Technology
 Pharmacy
 Law
 Power System Engineering

Affiliated colleges and institutes 
The university has been established in an area of 8.372 hectares and it is the only affiliating University of the state for technical institutions. There are 8 constituent and 80 affiliated colleges with 33,000 students in courses mentioned below:

The university imparts education in graduate, postgraduate and doctorate programmes in disciplines like Management, Engineering, Hotel Management, Computer Application, Pharmacy, etc.

It serves technical education through its progress monitored each semester, part-time PhD programme specially designed for teachers and scientists by giving them the opportunity to explore the untouched area of research. The university runs M.Tech. and M.Pharma programmes, apart from the 8 Constituent Colleges. It is spreading technical education in the remote underprivileged area of Uttarakhand hills.
College of Engineering Roorkee (COER), Roorkee
 THDC Institute of Hydropower Engineering and Technology, New Tehri
 Birla Institute of Applied Sciences, Bhimtal
 Seemant Institute of Technology, Pithoragarh
 Women Institute of Technology, Dehradun
 Institute of Technology Gopeshwar, Gopeshwar
 State Institute of Hotel Management and Catering Technology & Applied, New Tehri
 Dr APJ Abdul Kalam Institute of Technology, Tanakpur (Champawat)
 Institute of Technology, Uttarkashi (under construction)
 Institute of Technology, Salt, Almora (proposed)
 Doon PG College Of Paramedical Science and Hospital
 Gyani Inder Singh Institute of Professional Studies, Dehradun

References

External links
 

Technical universities and colleges in India
Universities in Uttarakhand
Universities and colleges in Dehradun
Science and technology in Dehradun
Educational institutions established in 2005
2005 establishments in Uttarakhand